Eastern Metro Athletic Conference (EMAC) is a Division I conference of the United States Collegiate Athletic Association (USCAA).  The conference consists of schools from North Carolina, South Carolina, and Virginia. The conference hosted its first championships in the 2018–19 season.

Founding members of the conference included Johnson and Wales (Charlotte), Mid-Atlantic Christian University, The Apprentice School, and Warren Wilson College. Clinton College was added as a founding member once the college was accepted into USCAA membership, bringing the inaugural membership up to five for the 2018–19 season. On November 8, 2021, the EMAC announced that Regent University would be joining the conference effective immediately.

Member schools

Current members 
The EMAC currently has six full members; all are private schools:

Conference sports

References

External links
The official EMAC website
The official USCAA website

College sports conferences in the United States
United States Collegiate Athletic Association
Sports in the Southern United States